Scott Peninsula is an ice-covered peninsula,  long, extending from the coast of Marie Byrd Land into the Getz Ice Shelf toward the west end of Wright Island. Mapped by United States Geological Survey (USGS) from surveys and U.S. Navy air photos, 1959–66. Named by Advisory Committee on Antarctic Names (US-ACAN) for Lieutenant Colonel Thomas Scott, USA, who assisted with the early establishment of U.S. Navy Operation Deepfreeze finances and liaison during the IGY.

Peninsulas of Marie Byrd Land